The Dubai Islands, formerly known as the Deira Islands are four undeveloped artificial islands off the coast of Deira, Dubai, United Arab Emirates. The project was initially called Palm Deira and was planned to be part of the Palm Islands. As of 2021, little development has taken place on the islands due to the financial crisis of 2007–2008.

History

Palm Deira 
In 2004, Dubai developer Nakheel launched the Palm Deira project as an 11 billion dirham property development off the coast of Deira in Dubai that was due to contain up to 8,000 villas. Dutch dredging contractor Van Oord was recruited to start the project in 2005. Then in early April 2008, Nakheel announced that more than a quarter of the total area of the Palm Deira had been reclaimed. In the wake of the financial crisis of 2007–2008, Nakheel had put projects like the Palm Jebel Ali, The World and Palm Deira on hold since 2008.

Rebranding as Deira Islands 
In October 2013, Nakheel re-branded and scaled down the project as Deira Islands. Deira Islands were developed to include the Deira Night Souk, Deira Mall, and Deira Island Towers and Boulevard on the islands to develop it into a shopping, retail, and housing waterfront. In December 2016 a bridge linking the mainland to the islands were opened.

Restart and rebranding as Dubai Islands 
In 2022, Nakheel rebranded itself and the project. It was renamed Dubai Islands and it is expected to house 80 hotels. The project has been restarted and no official opening date has been announced.

Planned Features

Deira Night Souk
The Deira Night Souk is planned to be a  market place that stretch along the coast of the Deira Islands opposite the mainland. According to the developers, Deira Night Souk will be the biggest night market in the world, but no construction of the souk took place.

Deira Mall
Deira Mall is planned to be a  mall with 1,100 retail spaces that is being developed on the islands. The design contract of the mall was awarded in June 2014, but never started construction.

See also
The World, another artificial island project in Dubai
Tourism in Dubai
Developments in Dubai

References

External links
 

Nakheel Properties
Resorts in Dubai
Artificial islands of Dubai
Waterfronts
Proposed buildings and structures in Dubai